The Small Astronomy Satellite 2, also known also as SAS-2, SAS B or Explorer 48, was a NASA gamma ray telescope. It was launched on 15 November 1972 into the low Earth orbit with a periapsis of 443 km and an apoapsis of 632 km. It completed its observations on 8 June 1973.

Mission 
SAS 2 was the second in the series of small spacecraft designed to extend the astronomical studies in the X-ray, gamma-ray, ultraviolet, visible, and infrared regions. The primary objective of the SAS-B was to measure the spatial and energy distribution of primary galactic and extragalactic gamma radiation with energies between 20 and 300 MeV. The instrumentation consisted principally of a guard scintillation detector, an upper and a lower spark chamber, and a charged particle telescope.

Launch 
Four solar paddles were used to recharge a 6 amp-h, eight-cell, nickel–cadmium battery and provide power to the spacecraft and telescope experiment. The spacecraft was spin stabilized by an internal wheel, and a magnetically torqued commandable control system was used to point the spin axis of the spacecraft to any point of the sky within approximately 1°. The experiment axis lay along this axis allowing the telescope to look at any selected region of the sky with its ± 30° acceptance aperture. The nominal spin rate was 1/12 rpm. Data were taken at 1000 bps and could be recorded on an onboard tape recorder and simultaneously transmitted in real time. The recorded data were transmitted once per orbit. This required approximately 5 minutes.

Experiment 
The telescope experiment was initially turned on 20 November 1972 and by 27 November 1972, the spacecraft became fully operational. The low-voltage power supply for the experiment failed on 8 June 1973. No useful scientific data were obtained after that date. With the exception of a slightly degraded star sensor, the spacecraft control section performed in an excellent manner.

SAS-2 first detected Geminga, a pulsar believed to be the remnant of a supernova that exploded 300,000 years ago.

Gamma-Ray Telescope 
The instrument consisted of two spark-chamber assemblies, four plastic scintillation counters, four Cherenkov counters, and an anticoincidence scintillation counter dome assembled to form a telescope. The spark chamber assembly consisted of 16-wire spark-chamber modules with a magnetic core readout system. Sandwiched between these two assemblies was a plane of plastic scintillator formed by the four scintillation counters. These plates provided the material for the gamma ray to convert into an electron-positron pair and provided a means of determining the energy of these particles by measuring their coulomb scattering. The spark chamber modules revealed the position and direction of the particles; from this information, the energy and direction of the gamma ray was determined. The scintillation counters and the four directional Cerenkov counters that were placed below the second spark chamber assembly constituted four independent counter coincidence systems. The single-piece plastic scintillator dome surrounded the whole assembly except at the bottom to discriminate against charged particles. The threshold of the instrument was about 30-MeV, and energies up to about 200-MeV could be measured along with the integral flux above 200 MeV. The angular resolution of the telescope varied as a function of energy and arrival direction from 1.5° to 5°. During the lifetime of the experiment from 15 November 1972 to 8 June 1973, approximately 55% of the celestial sphere, including most of the galactic plane, was surveyed.

See also 
 Small Astronomy Satellite1
 Small Astronomy Satellite 3

Notes

References 

1972 in spaceflight
Satellites formerly orbiting Earth
Explorers Program
Gamma-ray telescopes
Space telescopes